Nadrin is a village of Wallonia and a district of the municipality of Houffalize, located in the province of Luxembourg, Belgium.

The village is situated in the valley of the river Ourthe. It contains several archaeological sites; both the site of a Celtic fortress and the remains of Roman villas.

References

External links

Former municipalities of Luxembourg (Belgium)